The 5000 metres speed skating event was part of the speed skating at the 1936 Winter Olympics programme. The competition was held on Wednesday, 12 February 1936. Thirty-seven speed skaters from 16 nations competed.

Medalists

Records
These were the standing world and Olympic records (in minutes) prior to the 1936 Winter Olympics.

(*) The record was set on naturally frozen ice.

Nine speed skaters bettered the twelve years old Olympic record. Ivar Ballangrud set a new Olympic record with 8:19.6 seconds.

Results

References

External links
Official Olympic Report
 

Speed skating at the 1936 Winter Olympics